Alex Fontana (born May 1, 1995) is a professional Canadian football offensive lineman for the Hamilton Tiger-Cats of the Canadian Football League (CFL).

College career
Fontana played college football for the New Mexico Military Institute Broncos in 2014 and 2015 and transferred to the University of Houston to play for the Cougars in 2016. He did not play in 2017 due to a foot injury and transferred to the University of Kansas to play for the Jayhawks in 2018 as a graduate transfer.

Professional career

Ottawa Redblacks
Fontana was drafted by the Ottawa Redblacks in the first round with the seventh overall pick in the 2019 CFL Draft and signed with the team on May 18, 2019. He made his professional debut on June 15, 2019, against the Calgary Stampeders, and played in all 18 regular season games in 2019. With the cancellation of the 2020 CFL season, he did not play in 2020 and also decided not to play in 2021 as he was placed on the Redblacks' suspended list on July 9, 2021. He became a free agent upon the expiry of his contract on February 8, 2022.

Hamilton Tiger-Cats
On February 8, 2022, it was announced that Fontana had signed with the Hamilton Tiger-Cats to a two-year contract.

References

External links
Hamilton Tiger-Cats bio

Living people
1995 births
Players of Canadian football from Ontario
Canadian football people from Toronto
Canadian football offensive linemen
New Mexico Military Institute Broncos football players
Houston Cougars football players
Kansas Jayhawks football players
Ottawa Redblacks players
Hamilton Tiger-Cats players